Denis Brogniart (born 12 June 1967 in Dijon) is a French sport journalist and television host. He presents the show Koh-Lanta since 2002 and Formula One racing on TF1 with Marion Jollès Grosjean.

Personal life
Married in 2007 with Hortense, Denis Brogniart has four children (born between 2000 and 2007) including three with his current wife. He had twin sisters Lili and Violette, and a son named Dimitri. He has two brothers, one named Francis. His mother is a mathematics teacher and his father works in a bank.

Denis Brogniart was born to a mother who was a professor of mathematics and a father who holds a doctorate in law and a banking executive. He has two brothers: François and Gilles Brogniart.

After a scientific baccalaureate at the Lycée Louis Pergaud in Besançon, he tried for a year and a half to go to medical school. He gave up and started working as a lifeguard and animator at Club Med in Spain and as an SB instructor in Port-des-Barques (with the city of Chennevières). He is in charge of the animation of the pool games2. At the same time, he is studying to become a teacher of physical education and sports. After graduating from the University of Caen Basse-Normandie, he entered the Institut pratique de journalisme (IPJ) in Paris1. His dream has always been to work as a sports journalist.

Humanitarian and solidarity commitments

Denis Brogniart during a visit to an orphanage in Haiti.

Since 2010, Denis Brogniart has been supporting the Foundation of Emergency Architects, of which he has become the sponsor.

Emergency Architects whose purpose is to assist populations affected by natural or human disasters around the world, and who rebuild homes, schools or infrastructure to enable the poorest to regain decent living conditions as soon as possible after a disaster.

For the past two years, he has been the godfather of the war wounded of CABAT, the Army's Wounded Aid Cell. (source: Mindef - CABAT)

Denis Brogniart has also made several trips to the Foundation's activities, in Haiti for example, to testify and put his reputation at the service of this cause.

Since the beginning of 2018, Denis Brogniart has been an ambassador for the ARC Foundation for Cancer Research. He will also be the sponsor of the 5th edition of the Triathlon des Roses, dedicated to breast cancer research.

TV career
 2001: Les Aventuriers de Koh-Lanta (narrator, Thaïlande)
 2002: Les Aventuriers de Koh-Lanta (Costa Rica)
 2003: Fear Factor
 2003: Koh-Lanta (Panama)
 2004:
 Koh-Lanta (Panama)
 F1 à la Une
 2005:
 Koh-Lanta (Nouvelle-Calédonie)
 L'Île de la tentation
 2006: Koh-Lanta (Vanuatu)
 2007: Koh-Lanta (Philippines)
 2008:
 Auto Critiques and Moto Critiques, on Eurosport France
 Téléfoot
 Euro 2008: Le mag
 Koh-Lanta (Philippines)
 Qui peut battre Benjamin Castaldi ?
 Domino Day
 2009: Koh-Lanta : le retour des héros

References

1967 births
Living people
French radio presenters
French television presenters
French sports journalists
University of Caen Normandy alumni
People from Dijon
French male non-fiction writers